Howlan is a small community in northwestern Prince Edward Island. It is about 2 kilometres north of O'Leary.

Communities in Prince County, Prince Edward Island